Lawrence County School District  is a public school district based in Lawrence County, Alabama, headquartered in Moulton. Like many school districts in the United States, it is considered a separate government and has an entry in the U.S. Census Bureau's twice a decade census of governments.

Schools

High Schools
 East Lawrence High School
 Hatton High School
 Lawrence County Center of Technology
 Lawrence County High School

Middle Schools
 East Lawrence Middle School
 Moulton Middle School
 Mt. Hope Elementary/Middle School

Elementary Schools
 East Lawrence Elementary School
 Hatton Elementary School
 Hazlewood Elementary School
 Moulton Elementary School
 Mt. Hope Elementary/Middle School
 Speake School

External links

References
 

School districts in Alabama